Players and pairs who neither have high enough rankings nor receive wild cards may participate in a qualifying tournament held one week before the annual Wimbledon Tennis Championships.

Qualifiers

  Dinky Van Rensburg
  Diane Farrell
  Julie Richardson
  Kay McDaniel
  Jana Novotná
  Gretchen Rush
  Anna-Maria Fernandez
  Kim Steinmetz

Lucky losers

  Rebecca Bryant
  Jane Forman
  Ronni Reis
  Penny Barg

Qualifying draw

First qualifier

Second qualifier

Third qualifier

Fourth qualifier

Fifth qualifier

Sixth qualifier

Seventh qualifier

Eighth qualifier

External links

1986 Wimbledon Championships on WTAtennis.com
1986 Wimbledon Championships – Women's draws and results at the International Tennis Federation

Women's Singles Qualifying
Wimbledon Championship by year – Women's singles qualifying
Wimbledon Championships